Condition monitoring of transformers in electrical engineering is the process of acquiring and processing data related to various parameters of transformers so as to predict and prevent the failure of a transformer. This is done by observing the deviation of the transformer parameters from their expected values. Transformers are the most critical assets of electrical transmission and distribution system. Transformer failures could cause power outages, personal and environmental hazards and expensive rerouting or purchase of power from other suppliers. Transformer failures can occur due to various causes. Transformer in-service interruptions and failures usually result from dielectric breakdown, winding distortion caused by short circuit withstand, winding and magnetic circuit hot spot, electrical disturbances, deterioration of insulation, lightning, inadequate maintenance, loose connections, overloading, failure of accessories such as OLTCs, bushings, etc. Integrating the ‘individual cause’ monitoring allows for monitoring the overall condition of transformer. The important aspects of condition monitoring of transformers are:

Thermal modelling
The useful life of a transformer is determined partially by the ability of transformer to dissipate the internally generated heat to its surroundings. The comparison of actual and predicted operating temperatures can provide a sensitive diagnosis of the transformer condition and might indicate abnormal operation. The consequences of temperature rise may not be sudden, but gradual as long as it is within break down limit. Among these consequences, insulation deterioration is economically important. Insulation being very costly, its deterioration is undesirable. Thermal modelling is the development of a mathematical model that predicts the temperature profile of the power transformer using the principle of thermal analysis. The thermal model is used to determine the top oil temperature and hot spot temperature (maximum temperature occurring in the winding insulation system) temperature rise.

Dissolved gas analysis

Gases are produced by degradation of the transformer oil and solid insulating materials. Gases are generated at a much more rapid rate whenever an electrical fault occurs. Normal causes of fault gases are classified into three categories: Corona or partial discharge, thermal heating and arcing. These faults can be detected by evaluating the quantities of hydrocarbon gases, hydrogen and oxides of carbon that are present in the transformer. Different gases can serve as markers for different types of faults. The concentration and the relation of individual gases allow a prediction of whether a fault has occurred and what type it is likely to be.

Frequency response analysis
When a transformer is subjected to high currents through fault currents, the mechanical structure and windings are subjected to severe mechanical stresses causing winding movement and deformations. It may also result in insulation damage and turn-to-turn faults. Frequency response analysis (FRA) is a non-intrusive very sensitive technique for detecting winding movement faults and deformation assessment caused by loss of clamping pressure or by short circuit forces. FRA technique involves measuring the impedance of the windings of the transformer with a low-voltage sine input varying in a wide frequency range.

Partial discharge analysis
Partial discharge (PD) occurs when a local electric field exceeds a threshold value, resulting in a partial breakdown of the surrounding medium. Its cumulative effect leads to the degradation of insulation. PDs are initiated by the presence of defects during its manufacture, or the choice of higher stress dictated by design considerations. Measurements can be collected to detect these PDs and monitor the soundness of insulation. PDs manifest as sharp current pulses at transformer terminals, whose nature depends on the types of insulation, defects, measuring circuits and detectors used.

References 

 Giesecke, J.L. Transformer Condition Assessment using HFCT method. see article in transformers-magazine.com July 2016

Electric transformers